"Change" is a song by the British band Tears for Fears. Written by Roland Orzabal and sung by bassist Curt Smith, it was the band's fourth single release. It would eventually become the second hit from their debut LP The Hurting (1983) and second UK Top 5 chart hit, following the success of "Mad World". The song also gave Tears for Fears their first charting single in the United States when it cracked the Billboard Hot 100 in August 1983. "Change" was also a big international success, reaching the Top 40 in numerous countries.

Meaning

Song versions
The 7" version of "Change" is the same mix of the song found on The Hurting, but in a slightly edited form. An extended remix of the song is showcased as the lead track on the 12" single. While many copies of the 12" single use the 7" mix of the song as one of the B-sides, some feature an altogether different recording. Although uncredited on the singles themselves, this mix is labeled the "New Version" on the UK cassette release of The Hurting, where it was included as a bonus track. Featuring an alternate set of lyrics, this version actually predates the 7" mix, despite its title.

More recently, a mix by British DJ Joey Negro was included, along with other Tears for Fears remixes, on a 2004 promotional EP.

B-side
"The Conflict" is a song that served as the B-side to the "Change" single. Its repeated verse describes a conflict between two individuals. Sung by Curt Smith, this is one of the few songs in the Tears for Fears catalogue on which he shares a writing credit.

Music video
The music video for "Change" was directed by Clive Richardson, best known for his early work with Depeche Mode.

Track listings
7": Mercury / IDEA4 (United Kingdom, Ireland) / 812 677-7 (United States) / 6059 596 (Australia, Europe, South Africa) / SOV 2322 (Canada) / 7PP-101 (Japan)
"Change" (3:52)
"The Conflict" (4:02)

12": Mercury / IDEA412 (United Kingdom) / 6400 730 (Europe)
"Change [Extended Version]" (5:54)
"Change" (3:52)
"The Conflict" (4:02)

12": Mercury / IDEA412 (United Kingdom) / 6400 730 (Australia) / SOVX 2322 (Canada)
"Change [Extended Version]" (5:54)
"Change [New Version]" (4:33)
"The Conflict" (4:02)
The "New Version" is not specifically identified as such on this release

Chart positions

References

1983 singles
1983 songs
Phonogram Records singles
Songs written by Roland Orzabal
Song recordings produced by Ross Cullum
Song recordings produced by Chris Hughes (record producer)
Tears for Fears songs